Mote pillo is one of the most typical dishes from Cuenca, the Azuay province and the whole southern highlands in Ecuador.

Ingredients 
According to one of the classic recipes, mote pillo has: corn, eggs, milk, annatto, green onions, and salt. Garlic and cumin are also used.

Similar dishes 
Mote pillo is one of three emblematic dishes of the Azuay province, the other two being mote sucio (dirty mote, so-called because the corn is combined with crisp pork crumbs), and Motepata, a hearty soup traditionally prepared for carnival.

References 

Ecuadorian cuisine